Hangman may refer to:

 Executioner who carries out a death sentence by hanging
 Hangman (game), a game of guessing a word or phrase one letter at a time

Arts and entertainment

Comics
 Hangman (DC Comics), an enemy of Batman
 Hangman (Marvel Comics), the name of a couple of different characters in the Marvel Universe
 Hangman (Archie Comics), a number of Archie Comics superheroes
 Hangman Comics, a Golden Age MLJ/Archie Comics imprint comics title featuring the Hangman

Films
 The Hangman (1928 film), a German silent film
 The Hangman (1959 film), an American Western directed by Michael Curtiz

 Hangman, a 2001 television film featuring Mädchen Amick and Lou Diamond Phillips
 The Hangman (2005 film), an Indian film starring Om Puri and Shreyas Talpade
 Hangman (2015 film), a British found-footage film starring Jeremy Sisto
 Hangman (2017 film), an American crime thriller film starring Al Pacino

Literature
 "The Hangman" (poem), a 1954 children's poem by Maurice Ogden, and a 1964 animated short based on the poem
 Hangman, a 2000 novel by Michael Slade
 "Hangman", a short story by David Drake in his 1979 collection Hammer's Slammers

Songs
 "Hangman", by Black Stone Cherry from Kentucky, 2016
 "Hangman", by Chapman Whitney from Chapman Whitney Streetwalkers, 1974
 "Hangman", by Dave, 2018
 "Hangman", by Krokus from Hellraiser, 2006
 "The Maid Freed from the Gallows", a folk song sometimes given the title "Hangman"

Other
 Hangman (video game), a 1978 game for the Atari 2600 based on the guessing game
 The Hangman (roller coaster), a 1990s roller coaster at Opryland USA in Nashville, Tennessee
 Hangman Books, a British independent small press, and associated film and record projects

Places
 Hangman cliffs, on the north coast of Devon, England
 Hangman Island, in Boston Harbor, Massachusetts, US
 Hangman Creek, or Latah Creek, in Washington and Idaho, US
 Hangman Creek, a tributary of the White Salmon River via Gilmer Creek; see List of rivers of Washington (state)

People

Nickname
 Henry Hawley ("Hangman Hawley") (c. 1679–1759), British Army lieutenant general
 Reinhard Heydrich (1904–1942), German Nazi, one of the main architects of the Holocaust

Ring name
 Hangman Hughes (born 1974), Canadian professional wrestler
 Bobby Jaggers (1948–2012), American professional wrestler
 Gene LeBell (born 1932), American martial artist, professional wrestler, stunt performer, and actor
 Adam Page (born 1991), American professional wrestler

See also

 
 
 
 Hangmen (disambiguation)
 Hang (disambiguation)
 Hanging tree (disambiguation)
 The Hanged Man (disambiguation)
 Hanging man (candlestick pattern), a type of pattern on a market pricing graph

Lists of people by nickname